A polyquinane polycyclic compound consisting of fused five-membered hydrocarbon rings. If the compound is unsaturated instead of saturated, it is called a polyquinene. The simplest polyquinane is the bicyclic compound bicyclo[3.3.0]octane. Other members are triquinacene and dodecahedrane.

Triquinacene

The compound triquinacene, sometimes simply called quinacene (tricyclo[5.2.1.04,10]deca-2,5,8-triene) is the second member of a family of polyquinenes. It was synthesized in 1964 in the group of R. B. Woodward in connection with its suspected homoaromatic properties—though it was found to have no such properties—and also as part of a failed attempt to synthesize the then-elusive compound dodecahedrane. Triquinacene is stable, and has a melting point of 18 °C. The final step of its synthesis is a double Cope reaction to form two of the three alkenes.

See also 
 Fused 6 aromatic membered rings: the acenes
 Triquinacene is isomeric with: bullvalene, diisopropenyldiacetylene

References

Polycyclic nonaromatic hydrocarbons
Cyclopentanes